Tolufazepam is a drug that is a benzodiazepine derivative. Studies have shown tolufazepam to have anticonvulsant and anxiolytic activity in animal subjects, including convulsions elicited by pentylenetetrazol.

See also 
Benzodiazepine

References 

Benzodiazepines
Chloroarenes
GABAA receptor positive allosteric modulators
Lactams
Benzosulfones
4-Tolyl compounds